Facinas is a small village in the province of Cádiz, Andalusia, Spain. It is located near the Los Alcornocales Natural Park, and is  near the towns of Vejer de la Frontera and Tarifa. It is about fifteen kilometres from the coast with the beaches of Bolonia and Valdevaqueros as well as Zahara de los Atunes.

Economy

The mainstream economic activities are forestry work, hospitality and construction. Facinas has essential public services, such as a health center, state school, police station, and sports and cultural facilities.

Communications

Facinas is accessed by the N-340 through outlets located at kilometres 65 and 67 on this road. There are daily buses to Algeciras, La Linea de la Concepcion, Cadiz, Seville and Málaga.

References

External links
 www.facinas.org 

 

Populated places in the Province of Cádiz